Emmalocera neesimella is a species of snout moth in the genus Emmalocera. It was described by Émile Louis Ragonot in 1901. It is found in Korea and Japan.

References

Moths described in 1901
Emmalocera